Nianbadu is a rural town in Jiangshan, Zhejiang, China. It is surrounded by Bao'ab Township on the north, Songfeng Township and Tongfan Township of Jiangxi on the west, Shuangxikou Township on the east, and Panting Township and Guanlu Township of Fujian on the south. It lies at the junction of the three provinces, namely Zhejiang, Jiangxi and Fujian.

History
Nianbadu was incorporated as a town in 1931. In 1997, it was designated as a historic and cultural towns in Zhejiang by the Zhejiang Provincial Government. In 2007 it was inscribed as a historic and cultural towns in China.

Administrative division
As of 2015, the town is divided into 16 villages: Xunli, Huaqiao, Fengxi, Wufu, Xingdun, Lingtou, Jianqiang, Shanfeng, Chongshan, Zhangjiashan, Linfeng, Fuqiang, Heping, Xuluo, Zhaojunling and Gaofeng.

Geography
The Feng Stream flows through the town.

Economy
The town's economy is based on agricultural resources and tourism.

Transportation
The town is connected to two highways: National Highway G205 and G3 Beijing–Taipei Expressway.

Tourist attractions
The town has 36 Ming and Qing dynasties residential buildings and 11 religious buildings.

Television
The town served as a shooting location for the 2019 CCTV documentary Discover China: Ancient Town in China.

Gallery

References

Jiangshan